Haematococcus is a genus of algae in the family Haematococcaceae. Members of this group are a common cause of the pink color found in birdbaths.
One of the most notable species of Haematococcus is H. pluvialis, which is used in cosmetic products due to its production of astaxanthin, a powerful antioxidant carotenoid, under stress conditions.

References

Further reading
 
 Gutman, J., Zarka, A and Boussiba, S. 2009. The host-range of Paraphysoderma sedebokerensis, a chytrid that infects Haematococcus pluvialis. Eur. J. Phycol. 44: 509 - 514.

External links

Chlamydomonadales genera
Chlamydomonadales